Cueva del Indio, in Las Piedras, Puerto Rico, is a prehistoric rock art site in what is now a public park.  It was listed on the National Register of Historic Places in 2003.

Artifacts at the site appear to stem from Late Ceramic Period, third phase, i.e., from A.D. 1200 to 1500.

References

Archaeological sites on the National Register of Historic Places in Puerto Rico
Caves of Puerto Rico
Las Piedras, Puerto Rico
Pre-Columbian archaeological sites
National Register of Historic Places in Puerto Rico
Native American history of Puerto Rico
Rock art in North America